Apple Card is a credit card created by Apple Inc. and issued by Goldman Sachs, designed primarily to be used with Apple Pay on Apple devices such as an iPhone, iPad, Apple Watch, or Mac. Currently, it is available only in the United States, with 6.7 million American cardholders in early 2022.

History
On August 6, 2019, invitations to an early preview started being sent to randomly selected users who had previously signed up for email notifications ahead of Apple Card's official launch. It was released in the United States on August 20, 2019. Additional cardholders and joint accounts were not supported at its launch.

The card features a number of consumer-friendly features including no fees, software that encourages users to avoid debt or pay it down quickly, the industry’s lowest interest rate range for comparable cards, and a mandate to approve as many iPhone users as possible. These features are seen as being risky for a bank to take on, and led other banks with established consumer credit card operations including Apple's long time partner Barclays, along with Citigroup, JPMorgan Chase and Synchrony, to turn down Apple's proposal. Goldman Sachs defended the terms of the deal saying they were "thrilled" with the partnership and seeking "to disrupt consumer finance by putting the customer first."

Apple Card was announced at an Apple Special Event on March 25, 2019. Unlike previous special events which have historically served as platforms to announce upcoming hardware, this event focused on new internet software and services. Other services announced at the event include Apple TV+, Apple News+, and Apple Arcade.

On April 20, 2021, Apple announced that it would be introducing joint accounts and additional cardholders. These features have been introduced under the brand Apple Card Family. Individuals 18 years and older can be co-owners of the account, while individuals 13 years and older can be additional cardholders. Up to five individuals may be additional cardholders or co-owners.

In January 2023, Bloomberg reported that Goldman Sachs suffered $1 billion in losses because of the card.

Enrollment

Instant issuance 
Users can apply for an Apple Card directly from within the Wallet app. Upon approval, a digital Apple Card is made available immediately on all of the user's devices. Users also can order a physical card for use at locations that do not accept contactless payments.

The physical card does not display numbers on the front; instead, users receive a 16-digit virtual card number for websites and apps that do not accept Apple Pay. Apple Card details are accessible in the user's iCloud Keychain and can be auto-filled into online forms.

Titanium card 
Apple has designed a titanium Apple Card for shopping at locations where Apple Pay contactless payment is not accepted. The logos on the card are engraved, and the cardholder's name is laser-etched onto the card. The card has no card number, CVV security code, expiration date, or signature printed on the card. 

On delivery, users with the iPhone XS and above can activate the physical card by moving their phone near a NFC tag concealed within the card's packaging. Users with an iPhone X or earlier need to open the Wallet app before tapping the phone against the card.

Features

Cashback 
Regular purchases made using the physical card earn 1%, purchases made with Apple Pay earn 2%, and purchases at Apple Stores and selected partners earn 3%. Cashback on eligible purchases is deposited into the customer's Apple Cash account or applied as a statement credit.

Fees 
Apple Card does not charge late, foreign transaction, returned payment, or annual credit card fees, but it does generate interest fees when carrying a balance and interchange fees charged to the vendor.

Card management 
The Wallet app collates Apple Card transactions by category and provides weekly and monthly activity summaries. Apple Maps is used to provide a colour-coded category, map location, and contact details for the merchant (where available).

Privacy and security 

A unique card number is created for each device and is stored in a secure element which is used by Apple Pay to handle transactions and on-device cryptographic functions. Each transaction uses its own one-time dynamic security code and is authorized with Face ID, Touch ID, or passcode.

As with Apple Cash, transaction history for Apple Card is stored on and synced across devices using iCloud and encrypted such that only the authorized account holder can view it. Two-factor authentication must be enabled on the user's Apple ID account in order to apply for Apple Card.

Partnerships 
For Apple Card's initial US launch, Goldman Sachs assumed the role of the issuing bank, while Mastercard served as the payment network.

Reception 
In March 2020, about 3.1 million Americans held the Apple Card. That number has grown to 6.7 million cardholders as of early 2022. Six in ten Apple Card users use it as their primary credit card.

On October 1, 2019, MarketWatch published an article stating that Goldman Sachs is not reporting payments to the credit reporting agencies.  The article suggests that Apple and Goldman Sachs rushed development of the card, and that the companies would fix the issue over time. 

On November 7, 2019, David Heinemeier Hansson posted on Twitter that he was given 20 times the credit limit than was offered his wife despite her having a better credit score. He accused Goldman Sachs of gender discrimination by using algorithms to determine a person's credit limit. Apple's co-founder Steve Wozniak also tweeted that he received ten times the credit limit that his wife was offered. In response to Hansson's tweets, the New York State Department of Financial Services launched an investigation into Goldman Sachs's practices.

On March 23, 2021, the New York State Department of Financial Services issued a report summarizing its findings after investigating consumer complaints about the Apple Card. The investigation, which included a review of several thousand pages of records and written responses from Goldman Sachs Bank and Apple, interviews of witnesses and Apple Card applicants, and analysis of underwriting data for approximately 400,000 New York State applicants for the Apple Card, did not produce evidence of unlawful discrimination against applicants under fair lending law.

References

External links
 

Financial services companies established in 2019
2019 introductions
Apple Inc. services
Contactless smart cards
Credit cards in the United States